Jeff Bates, also known as hemos, is the co-founder of Slashdot along with Rob Malda ("CmdrTaco").

Biography 
Bates graduated from Holland Christian High School in 1994 and received a Bachelor's degree in History and Biology  from Hope College in 1998.

Malda and Bates created Slashdot in 1997, while undergraduates at Hope College. In 1999 they sold the site to Andover.net, which was acquired by VA Linux Systems in 2000 (which became SourceForge, Inc. in 2007, then Geeknet, Inc. in 2009).

Bates served as Director of Media Operations for Geeknet from May 2001 through July 2004, when he became Vice President of Editorial Operations and Executive Editor of Slashdot.  In February 2008 he became Geeknet's Vice President of Platform and managed the core engineering and product teams for Slashdot, freshmeat, and SourceForge.

In August 2011, Bates joined Google.  He worked at Google as Chief of Staff for the CIO, and as of 2019, is the Chief of Product Operations.

Slashdot
Bates and Malda founded Slashdot in July 1997 using the name "chips and dips". The website was renamed in September 1997. Slashdot is a technology-related news website, which features user-submitted and evaluated news stories about science and technology related topics.  

In 2012, Slashdot had about 3.7 million unique visitors per month and received more than 5300 comments per day.  The site has won more than 20 awards, including People's Voice Awards in 2000 for Best Community Site and Best News Site. Occasionally, a story will hyperlink to a server causing a large surge of traffic, which can overwhelm some smaller or independent sites, a phenomenon known as the Slashdot effect.

References

Living people
American computer businesspeople
American Internet celebrities
Geeknet
Hope College alumni
Slashdot
1976 births
21st-century American businesspeople
Google employees